A coup d'état in the capital of Montenegro, Podgorica was allegedly planned and prepared for 16 October 2016, the day of the parliamentary election, according to Montenegro's special prosecutor. In September 2017, the trial of those indicted in connection with the plot began in the High Court in Podgorica, the indictees including leaders of the Montenegrin opposition and two alleged Russian  intelligence agents. Russian government officials denied any involvement. In 2019, the Higher Court found the accused guilty of plotting to commit ″terrorist acts″, also of "undermine the constitutional order of Montenegro" and first instance sentenced 13 people. In February 2021, the appellate court annulled the first instance verdict on all counts of the indictment.

Background

It is believed that the plot was designed as a last-ditch attempt by the Montenegrin pro-Serbian and pro-Russian opposition to prevent Montenegro's accession to NATO, a move stridently opposed by Russia's government that had issued direct threats to Montenegro concerning such eventuality. This theory was re-affirmed by the court verdict handed down in 2019.

Arrests and alleged plot
 
On the eve of 16 October 2016, the day of the parliamentary election in Montenegro, a group of 20 Serbian and Montenegrin citizens, including the former head of Serbian Gendarmery Bratislav Dikić, were arrested; some of them, along with other persons, including two Russian citizens, were later formally charged by the authorities of Montenegro with an attempted coup d'état. In early November 2016, Montenegro's special prosecutor for organised crime and corruption, Milivoje Katnić, alleged that "a powerful organisation" that comprised about 500 people from Russia, Serbia and Montenegro was behind the coup plot. In February 2017, Montenegrin officials accused the Russian 'state structures' of being behind the attempted coup, which allegedly envisaged an attack on the country's parliament and assassination of prime minister Milo Đukanović.

The details about the coup plot were first made public at the end of October 2016 by Serbia's prime minister Aleksandar Vučić, whose public statement on the matter stressed the role of Serbia's law enforcers, especially the Serbian Security Intelligence Agency, in thwarting it. The statement was immediately followed by an unscheduled visit to Belgrade by Nikolai Patrushev, secretary of Russia's Security Council.

According to the prime minister Duško Marković′s statements made in February 2017, the government received definitive information about the coup being prepared on 12 October 2016, when a person involved in the plot gave away the fallback scenario of his Russian minders; this information was also corroborated by the security services of NATO member countries, who helped the Montenegrin government to investigate the plot. One of the charged, Predrag Bogićević from Kragujevac, a veteran and leader of the Ravna Gora Movement, said that Saša Sinđelić informed him on a possible attack on Serbs who participated in the October 16th protest. Bogićević, in Serbian detention, said through his lawyer that there was no talks whatsoever on a coup and no mentions of Đukanović.

The Moscow–based Russian Institute for Strategic Studies (RISS), which has close ties to Russian Foreign Intelligence Service (SVR), was mentioned by mass media as one of the organisations involved in devising the coup plot; in early November 2017, Russian president Vladimir Putin sacked the RISS director, Leonid P. Reshetnikov, a ranking veteran officer of the SVR.

Persons alleged to be involved
 Eduard Shishmakov, GRU, conspirator, not extradited
 Vladimir Popov, GRU, conspirator, not extradited
 Saša "Aleksandar" Sinđelić, prosecutor's witness
 Andrija Mandić, leader of New Serb Democracy
 Milan Knežević, leader of Democratic People's Party
 Mihailo Čađenović, Andrija Mandić's driver
 Several Serbian nationals, including Bratislav Dikić

Criminal prosecution, trial, and verdict
In early June 2017, the High Court in Podgorica confirmed the indictment of 14 people, including two Russians and two pro-Russia Montenegrin opposition leaders, Andrija Mandić and Milan Knežević (the Democratic Front), who had been charged with "preparing a conspiracy against the constitutional order and the security of Montenegro" and an "attempted terrorist act." Officials alleged that the plotters had conspired to take over parliament during the October 2016 parliamentary election, assassinate then-prime minister Milo Đukanović, and install a pro-Russian government in order to halt Montenegro's bid to join NATO. According to the prosecution, the relevant orders had been received by Saša Sinđelić, an Austria-born Serbian citizen previously convicted of murder in Croatia and now acting as a witness for the prosecution, from Eduard Shishmakov (at first referred to by media as Shirokov), who had earlier been expelled from Poland as an exposed officer of the Russian military intelligence.

On 6 September 2017, the trial of those indicted began in the High Court in Podgorica, the two Russian nationals, Eduard Shishmakov and Vladimir Popov, being tried in absentia. In a separate case, on 18 October 2017 Milan Knežević was convicted of assaulting a policeman on 17 October 2015 and sentenced to 7 months in prison.

At the end of October 2017, the court heard evidence from Saša Sinđelić, who, among other things, reportedly told the court he had learned from Eduard Shishmakov of Ramzan Kadyrov, the Head of the Chechen Republic, being involved in the coup plot. At the end of November 2017, the Russian daily broadsheet Izvestia reported that Andrija Mandić and Milan Knežević had sent a letter to Russian foreign minister Sergey Lavrov, saying Kadyrov had figured in the indictment starting from the previous week and requesting Russia's support. The defence sought to question the credibility and psychiatric competence of the prosecutor's witness.

In early June 2018, the court in Podgorica heard evidence from Brian Scott, a former CIA operative and the chief executive officer of a U.S. risk-management company Patriot Defense Group: he was questioned by prosecutors about these events. Scott stated that his company, Strategic Risk Management, refused the request due to reports of a connection between Democratic Front and Russian intelligence officers. In July 2018, the Montenegrin prosecutors launched a formal investigation into other's alleged role in the coup plot.

On 9 May 2019, the Higher Court in Montenegro found guilty of plotting to commit ″terrorist acts″ and undermine the constitutional order of Montenegro during the 2016 parliamentary election and first instance sentenced 13 people, including the two alleged Russian military intelligence officers, Eduard Shishmakov and Vladimir Popov (to 15 and 12 years in prison, in absentia, respectively),  and two opposition leaders, Andrija Mandić and Milan Knežević (five-year jail terms each); Bratislav Dikić was sentenced to eight years in jail.

Annulment of the verdict
On 5 February 2021, the Court of Appeals of Montenegro annulled the first instance verdict on all counts of the indictment. "The Council annulled the first-instance verdict because significant violations of the provisions of the criminal procedure were committed in the procedure of its passing and in the verdict itself, due to which neither factual nor legal conclusions could be accepted in the first-instance verdict, as in the existence of criminal offenses guilty, as well as in relation to the existence of their guilt for the acts", it is stated in the announcement of the appellate court. The "coup d’état" case was returned to the High Court in Podgorica, for a retrial before a completely changed composition. Many saw the decisions of the appellate court as a confirmation of then ruling  Democratic Party of Socialists's mounted political process against its political opposition, and proof that the first instance verdict was passed under the pressure of the then DPS-led government in Montenegro.

Aftermath

On 28 April 2017, Montenegro's parliament voted 46–0 to join NATO, while the majority of opposition parties kept boycotting parliament sessions and protesters burned NATO flags outside. Tensions between Montenegro and Russia continued to escalate thereafter. In November 2019, the U.S. Department of Defense-authorized, editorially independent newspaper, Stars and Stripes, cited the "hybrid attack during [Montenegrin] elections in 2016" as an explanation why the first NATO counter-hybrid warfare team was being deployed to Montenegro.

In its political rights and civil liberties worldwide report in May 2020, Freedom House marked Montenegro under the Đukanović's party (DPS) rule as a hybrid regime rather than a democracy because of declining standards in governance, justice, elections and media freedom. Freedom House stated that years of increasing state capture, abuse of power and strongman tactics employed by long-term Prime Minister and President Milo Đukanović had tipped country over the edge, and for the first time since 2003, Montenegro was no longer categorised as a democracy. The report emphasised the unequal electoral process, cases of political arrests, negative developments related to judicial independence, media freedoms, as well as a series of unresolved cases of corruption within the DPS-led government.

On 1 September 2020, Montenegrin President Milo Đukanović accused Serbian President Aleksandar Vučić and Belgrade-based media of interfering in the internal politics of Montenegro, as well of alleged trying to revive a "Greater Serbia policy".

See also

 List of coups d'état and coup attempts since 2010
 Russia involvement in regime change
 NATO-Russia relations, Montenegro-NATO relations
 2015–16 Montenegrin crisis
 2016 Montenegrin parliamentary election

Notes

References

2010s coups d'état and coup attempts
Coup
Coup
October 2016 events in Europe
National security of Montenegro
Russia intelligence operations
Montenegro–Russia relations
Russia–Serbia relations
Law enforcement in Montenegro